"Wishing Well" is a song by the English rock band Free. It was written by the entire group about their close friend Bevan T. Woodhouse. It was released in December 1972 as a single and entered the UK Singles Chart on 13 January 1973, reaching number 7. The single was re-released in 1985 and reached number 96 in the UK Singles Chart. 
The song is featured on the band's sixth and final studio album, Heartbreaker. It was their final hit single before the group disbanded in 1973, with Paul Rodgers and Simon Kirke going on to form Bad Company.

Matthew Greenwald of AllMusic said: 
"Lyrically, the song can be interpreted many ways, but it appears on the surface to be an angry message to a friend with heavy substance abuse problems who has one foot in 'the wishing well', which is possibly an analogy for 'one foot in the grave'. Next to "All Right Now", this is indeed the band's most important - and perhaps finest moment"

References 

1972 singles
Free (band) songs
Songs written by Paul Rodgers
Island Records singles